was a Japanese comedian and actor. Nicknamed "The Japanese Chaplin", he is best known outside Japan for his appearance as Tako, the promoter of King Kong in King Kong vs. Godzilla (1962).

Arishima's real name was Tadao Oshima. He was born in Nagoya and both of his parents died when he was a teenager. His love of the theater began in childhood, and he moved to Tokyo in 1936 to pursue that interest. He spent the next decade working with various theatrical troupes until he made his film debut in 1947, with Shochiku Studios. He became a household name in Japan after his move to Toho in 1955. At Toho he was featured in two very popular series, the "Wakadaishō series" ("Young Guy") movies starring Yūzō Kayama, and the "Shacho" ("Company President") movies featuring the Crazy Cats (クレージーキャッツ) comedy team. In addition to Ishirō Honda's King Kong vs. Godzilla, Arishima appeared in two Toho fantasy films directed by Senkichi Taniguchi: The Lost World of Sinbad (Daitozoku) (1963) and The Adventure of Taklamakan (Kiganjō no bōken) (1966). In 1972, he left Toho and a freelance actor.

Arishima's slight physical build contrasted well with the portly comedian Frankie Sakai, leading to their teaming in several comedies. He was also popular on several television shows, one of his last roles being "Kanō Gorōzaemon," the elderly advisor to the shogun in Abarenbō Shōgun.

Filmography

Film

Television
Taikoki (1965) as Sorori Shinzaemon
Daichūshingura (1971) as Yahei Horibe
Naruto Hichō (1977–78)

References

External links
 
Arishima Ichiro NHK Jimbutsuroku

1916 births
1987 deaths
Japanese comedians
People from Nagoya
20th-century Japanese male actors
Recipients of the Medal with Purple Ribbon
20th-century comedians